The Northern Mindoro (North Mangyan) languages are one of two small clusters of languages spoken by the Mangyan people of Mindoro Island in the Philippines. 

The languages are Alangan, Iraya, and Tadyawan.

There is some evidence that points at a closer relationship of the Northern Mindoro languages with the Central Luzon languages. Both branches share the phonological innovation Proto-Austronesian *R >  and some common lexical items such as  'to see',  'cold'.

See also
Southern Mindoro languages
Ratagnon language

References

Further reading

Barbian, Karl-Josef. 1977. The Mangyan languages of Mindoro. Cebu City: University of San Carlos.
Barbian, Karl-Josef. 1977. English-Mangyan vocabulary. Cebu City: University of San Carlos.
Zorc, R. David. 1972. Alangan notes.
Zorc, R. David. 1972. Iraya notes.
Zorc, R. David. 1972. Tadyawan (Pola) notes.
Zorc, R. David. 1972. Victoria (Tadyawan) notes.

 
Philippine languages
Languages of Occidental Mindoro
Languages of Oriental Mindoro
Mindoro